Jacob Taylor (11 July 1928 – 26 March 2016) was a Canadian rower. He competed in the men's eight event at the 1952 Summer Olympics.

References

1928 births
2016 deaths
Canadian male rowers
Olympic rowers of Canada
Rowers at the 1952 Summer Olympics
Rowers from Toronto